Kevin Brian Smith (born 28 August 1957) is an English former cricketer. Smith was a left-handed batsman who bowled slow left-arm orthodox. He was born at Brighton, Sussex.

Smith made his first-class debut for Sussex against Oxford University in 1978. He made three further first-class appearances for the county in the 1978 season, against Middlesex, Gloucestershire and Kent. In his four first-class appearances, Smith scored 90 runs at an average of 12.85, with a high score of 43. In that same season he made two List A appearances against Hampshire and Northamptonshire in the 1978 John Player League.

His uncle, Gerald Cogger, also played first-class cricket for Sussex.

References

External links

1957 births
Living people
Sportspeople from Brighton
English cricketers
Sussex cricketers